Boparan Holdings Ltd is a company based in Birmingham, England, that owns food production and restaurant businesses. It is owned by Ranjit Singh Boparan and his wife, Baljinder Kaur Boparan. In March 2020, Boparan bought the Italian restaurant chain Carluccio's for £3.4 million. In October of the same year, Boparan purchased Gourmet Burger Kitchen.

Food production

2 Sisters Food Group

2 Sisters Food Group was established in 1993 by Ranjit Singh Boparan, as a retail frozen poultry cutting and processing operation. It has 36 manufacturing sites in the United Kingdom, eight in the Netherlands, five in Ireland, and one in Poland. The group employs 23,000 people, with annual sales of £3.12 billion. It was listed 7th on the 2017 Sunday Times Top Track 100.

Northern Foods

Following a period of asset disposal, on 17 November 2010, Northern Foods announced it was merging with Irish ready-made meals supplier Greencore. The new company was to be called Essenta, with headquarters in Ireland but listed on the London Stock Exchange.

On 21 January 2011, Boparan announced a £341 million bid to buy Northern Foods and he was appointed as the company's chairman in April 2011. On 13 May 2011, the company was delisted from the London Stock Exchange.

FishWorks
FishWorks is a seafood restaurant chain, originally started by Mitch Tonks.

Harry Ramsden's

In April 2006, Compass Group sold its specialist airports and railways division SSP, including the Harry Ramsden's fish and chip shop chain, for £1.822 million to EQT Partners of Sweden. In 2008, Chris Sullivan was appointed the new Managing Director.  On 19 January 2010, SSP sold Harry Ramsden's to Boparan Ventures Ltd, the private investment vehicle of Boparan. BVL announced plans to open another 100 units in the next five years and create 600 new jobs.

In August 2019, all 34 Harry Ramsden's were sold to Deep Blue Restaurants.

Cinnamon Collection
In January 2016, Boparan Restaurant Holdings (BRH) acquired the three Cinnamon Collection chain of restaurants in London, an Indian outlet.

Grove Farm Turkey
In April 2016, the Boparan Private Office acquired the Irish Turkey business Grove Farm.

Giraffe Restaurants

In June 2016, the supermarket chain Tesco announced that it was to sell its 15-venue Giraffe Restaurants chain to Boparan Restaurants for "an undisclosed sum" three years after it bought the chain for £50 million.

Bernard Matthews

In September 2016, it was announced Singh's Private Office (Boparan's Private Office) was to acquire turkey producer Bernard Matthews for £87.5 million.

Ed's Easy Diner

In October 2016, Singh's Private Office added to its restaurant and dining portfolio with the acquisition of part of the 1950s themed restaurant chain Ed's Easy Diner.

Carluccio's

In May 2020 it was announced that the group had bought the Carluccio’s brand and 31 restaurants from administrators.

References

Food manufacturers of the United Kingdom
Family-owned companies of the United Kingdom